Elinor Sweetman (c. 1860/1861 – 1922) was a Victorian era Irish poet and author who worked with both her sisters.

Early life
Elinor Mary Sweetman was born in County Dublin to Michael James Sweetman (1829-1864), of Lamberton Park, Queen's County, JP, High Sheriff of Queen's County in 1852, and (Mary) Margaret, only child and heir of Michael Powell, of Fitzwilliam Square, Dublin. She had two brothers and three sisters. The Sweetman family were landed gentry of Longtown, County Kildare, and per family tradition were "long settled in Dublin" and "previously resident near Callan and Newtown, County Kilkenny", tracing their line back to the mid-1500s. 

After her father's death, when she was a small child, the remaining family moved to Brussels in 1873 and she spent her summers in Switzerland. Her sisters, Agnes and Mary Elizabeth were also writers. With her sisters she began two family magazines: the ‘Ivy Home Magazine’ and ‘Ivy Home Library’.Her poetry was used in several of her sisters' novels. She remained unmarried and was one of her mother's heirs after her death in 1912.

Sweetman was a poet and writer published in magazines and periodicals as well as in collections of poetry and her own folios. Her work was often illustrated by well known artists of the day including Arthur Wallis Mills and Elizabeth Gulland. Though she has largely been ignored as a writer she was critically celebrated at the time and is a clear example of the poetry of women at the time discussing religion and romance.

Selected works
 Carmina Mariana; an English anthology in verse in honour of or in relation to the Blessed Virgin Mary, Edited by Shipley, Orby, 1832-1916, ed; Publication date 1894; Publisher London, New York : Burns and Oates
 Footsteps of the Gods and other poema (1893)
 Pastorals and other poems (1899)
 The wild orchard (1911)
 Psalms, verse (1911)
 The Oxford Book Of Victorian Verse (1912)

Further reading

References

External links 
 

1860s births
1922 deaths
Irish women novelists
Date of birth unknown